Yamila Zambrano Cuencha (born February 10, 1986 in Havana) is a Cuban judoka who competed in the women's extra-lightweight category. She captured a gold medal in the 48-kg division at the 2004 Pan American Judo Championships in Margarita Island, Venezuela.

Zambrano qualified as an 18-year-old teen for the Cuban squad in the women's extra-lightweight class (48 kg) at the 2004 Summer Olympics in Athens, by placing first from the Pan American Judo Championships in Margarita Island, Venezuela. She lost her opening match to Algeria's Soraya Haddad, who successfully scored an ippon, and threw her into the tatami with a kuchiki taoshi (single leg takedown) assault at one minute and fifty-four seconds.

References

External links

1986 births
Living people
Olympic judoka of Cuba
Judoka at the 2004 Summer Olympics
Sportspeople from Havana
Cuban female judoka
20th-century Cuban women
21st-century Cuban women